The Moldovan ambassador in Beijing is the official representative of the Government in Chișinău to the Government of the People's Republic of China

List of representatives

References 

 
China
Moldova